The Stirling & District Amateur Football Association (SDAFA) is a football (soccer) league competition, primarily for amateur clubs in the Stirlingshire area of Scotland.  It was formed in 1947.  The association is affiliated to the Scottish Amateur Football Association.

League Officials
League officers and committee

Member clubs
As of the 2017–18 season, the Stirling & District AFA had 45 member clubs:

Premier Division
Barrhill AFC
Bonnybridge YFP
Bo'ness Cadora
Callander Thistle
Grangemouth Rovers
Greenhill AFC
Linlithgow Rose CFC
Polmont Community
Slamannan AFC
Stirling University AFC

Division One A
Beechwood Albion
Central Albion
Denny AFA
Doune Castle
Glenvale
Kincardine
Loganlea United
Maddiston AFC
Pennies
Stirling Colts
Tillicoultry AFC

Division One B
Camelon Albion
Campsie FC
Clackmannan Community
Condorrat AFC
Drumpellier Thistle
Fallin
MLS Leeds
Riverside AFC
Stirling Boys Club
Syngenta
Tullibody Community
Westfield Colts

Division Two
AFC Carbrain
AFC Chryston
Carronshore Athletic
Dollar Glen
Dunblane Soccer Club
Forth Thistle
Gormac Thistle
Greentree
Harestanes United
Lauriston Amateurs
Mill Inn
Stirling Amateurs

League structure

The Stirling & District AFA is split into four divisions, a Premier Division of 12 teams, Division One which contains 11 teams and the bottom two tiers, Division Two & Three which both contain 14 clubs respectively.  Each league has two clubs which are automatically promoted/relegated between divisions with the exception of Division Three, from which there is no relegation.  As a stand-alone Association and not part of Scotland's pyramid system, the Premier Division does not act as a feeder league and as such there is currently no promotion available.

The league setup for season 2017-18:

Cup Competitions

As well as the league, the association administers three cup competitions for teams in membership: the David McKinnon Memorial Trophy, the Mathieson Challenge Trophy & the JF Colley Cup.  Additionally, each division compete in a pre-season League Cup to supplement their round-robin campaign.

National and District Cups

In addition, member clubs are also likely to play in the Scottish Amateur Cup and one of the two district cups (East or West).  Below are teams who have won these trophies, whilst playing in the Stirling & District AFA.

Scottish Amateur Cup
1967–68 Cambusbarron Rovers
1968–69 Cambusbarron Rovers
1977–78 Cambusbarron Rovers

West of Scotland Amateur Cup
1980–81 Cambusbarron Rovers
1982–83 Bannockburn AFC

East of Scotland Amateur Cup
1960–61 Grangemouth Refinery AFC
1970–71 Cambusbarron Rovers
1979–80 Windsor AFC
1982–83 Milton AFC
1990–91 Fallin M.W.
1994–95 Fallin M.W.
1997–98 Fallin M.W.
2004–05 Falkirk AFC
2005–06 Stenhouse Athletic
2009–10 Bluebell AFC
2010–11 Falkirk AFC

External links
Website of the Stirling & District AFA
Website of the Scottish Amateur FA

Football leagues in Scotland
Sports organizations established in 1947
1947 establishments in Scotland
Amateur association football in Scotland